Soledade, Paraíba is a municipality in the state of Paraíba in the Northeast Region of Brazil. Acquired as part of a farm purchased by João de Sousa, the land was donated to a church, which planned to build a chapel. However, a cholera outbreak in 1864 meant that the first use of the land would be a cemetery.

See also
List of municipalities in Paraíba

References

Municipalities in Paraíba